The WWWF United States Heavyweight Championship was a singles title used sporadically in the World Wide Wrestling Federation between 1960 and 1976. During the variable periods in which it was used, the title served as the promotion's secondary singles championship to the WWWF World Heavyweight Championship. Three years after the title was retired for good, it was replaced by the WWF North American Heavyweight Championship as the promotion's secondary title.

History 
Prior to Capitol Wrestling leaving the National Wrestling Alliance and becoming the WWWF, the company hosted a version of the NWA United States Heavyweight Championship for several months in 1960-1961.  The only known holder of this title was Buddy Rogers, who vacated the title upon winning the NWA World Heavyweight Championship from Pat O'Connor in Chicago in June 1961.

This title has no connection to the current WWE United States Championship, the lineage of which dates back to the NWA/WCW United States Heavyweight Championship originally created in 1975 in Mid-Atlantic Championship Wrestling.

Reigns

Combined reigns

See also 

 WWE United States Championship
 World Wrestling Entertainment
 Professional wrestling in the United States

Notes

References

External links
 WWWF United States Heavyweight Championship

WWE championships
United States professional wrestling championships